Russell Harold Ramsay (August 5, 1928 — February 9, 2003) was a politician in Ontario, Canada. He served in the Legislative Assembly of Ontario from 1978 to 1985, and was a cabinet minister in the government of William Davis. Ramsay was a member of the Progressive Conservative Party.

Background
Ramsay was born in Sault Ste. Marie, and was educated in that city and at Queen's University in Kingston. He became manager of CJIC-TV in 1956, and served as vice-president of Huron Broadcasting.  Ramsay was the recipient of a Centennial Medal in 1967, and was named "Man of the Year" by Sault Ste. Marie's Rotary Club in 1969. He was a member of the Sault Ste. Marie city council from January to June 1975. He was married to Margaret with whom he raised five children.

Politics
He campaigned for the House of Commons of Canada in the 1965 and lost to Liberal candidate George Nixon in Algoma West. In 1968 he ran against Liberal Terry Murphy in Sault Ste. Marie and lost again.

Ramsay was elected to the Ontario legislature in a by-election held on December 14, 1978. Campaigning in the provincial division of Sault Ste. Marie, he was elected by a comfortable margin over a candidate of the New Democratic Party. He was re-elected without difficulty in the 1981 provincial election.  He was appointed to cabinet as Provincial Secretary for Resources Development on April 10, 1981. He was promoted to Minister of Labour on February 13, 1982.

Ramsay supported Larry Grossman's to replace Bill Davis as Progressive Conservative leader in February 1985, and was not appointed to the cabinet of Frank Miller, the successful candidate.  He lost to New Democratic Party candidate Karl Morin-Strom by 1,069 votes in the 1985 provincial election.  In 1996, Ramsay ran in a mayoral by-election in Sault Ste. Marie, but was defeated by former federal MP Steve Butland.

Cabinet positions

Later life
In January 1987, he was appointed to the Health Discipline Board and the Denture Therapists Appeal Board. Three months later he was moved to the Industrial Accident Prevention Association. He stayed in that position until 1995 when the board was axed by the Mike Harris administration.

Ramsay received the Paul Dalseg Community Achievement Award in 2000.  He died in 2003 at a Sault Ste. Marie nursing home, having previously been diagnosed with Alzheimer's disease.  A boardroom at Sault Ste. Marie's City Hall is named in his honour, as is the street leading to City Hall. In 2009, Ramsay was selected for induction into the Sault Ste. Marie Walk of Fame.

References

External links
 

1928 births
2003 deaths
Deaths from Alzheimer's disease
Neurological disease deaths in Ontario
Sault Ste. Marie, Ontario city councillors
Progressive Conservative Party of Ontario MPPs
Queen's University at Kingston alumni